Hütten was an Amt ("collective municipality") in the district of Rendsburg-Eckernförde, in Schleswig-Holstein, Germany. The seat of the Amt was in Ascheffel. In January 2008, it was merged with the Amt Wittensee to form the Amt of Hüttener Berge.

The Amt of Hütten consisted of the following municipalities:

Ahlefeld 
Ascheffel
Bistensee 
Brekendorf 
Damendorf 
Hütten
Osterby 
Owschlag

Former Ämter in Schleswig-Holstein